Achillicus or Achillikos was a village of ancient Greece on the island of Astypalaia.

Its site is unlocated.

References

Populated places in the ancient Aegean islands
Former populated places in Greece
Lost ancient cities and towns